Horizon is the sixth studio album by American country music artist Eddie Rabbitt. It was released in 1980 under the Elektra Records label. The album produced two singles, both of which reached number one on country charts. The lead-off single "Drivin' My Life Away" reached number 5 on the Billboard 100 and 9 the Adult Contemporary chart. The other single, "I Love a Rainy Night" reached number one on all three charts, the only single in Rabbitt's career to ever do so.

Horizon reached number one on country album charts and ultimately reached platinum status. Allmusic retrospectively gave the album 4.5 stars out of 5 and praised the tracks on side one for their "sun-inspired, guitar-based productions, heavy on the echo" but described the second side as being "a bit ballad-heavy." The review described the album as a "rockabilly release".  In 2009, the full album was released in CD format.

Track listing

Chart performance

Album

Singles

Personnel
As listed in liner notes
Don Barrett - bass guitar
Larry Byrom - electric guitar
Alan Feingold - piano, keyboards
Sherry Grooms - background vocals
David Hungate - bass guitar
Randy McCormick - keyboards, synthesizer
David Malloy - background vocals
Farrell Morris - percussion
Paul Overstreet - background vocals
Norbert Putnam - bass guitar
Eddie Rabbitt - lead vocals, background vocals, acoustic guitar
James Stroud - drums, percussion

String arrangements by Randy McCormick and Larry Muhoberac

References

Roland, Tom. [ Horizon], Allmusic.

1980 albums
Eddie Rabbitt albums
Albums produced by David Malloy
Elektra Records albums